P. Krishna Pillai (19 August 1906 at Vaikom, Kottayam – 19 August 1948 at Muhamma, Alleppey) was a communist revolutionary from Kerala, India. He was one of the founding leaders of the Communist Party of India in Kerala, and a poet.

Early life
P. Krishna Pillai was born in a middle-class Nair family of Vaikom. He lost both his parents at an early age and consequently had to drop out of school at the fifth grade. Leaving his home in 1920, he travelled extensively in the north of the Indian subcontinent.

When he returned home two years later, he found Kerala seething with social unrest. Subsequently, he took part in a number of popular movements. He was an active volunteer of Vaikom Satyagraha (1924) and Salt Satyagraha march from Kozhikode to Payyanur (1930). In 1931 he became the first non Nambothiri Brahmin (he was from Nair Community of Kerala) to ring the temple bell of the Guruvayoor temple.

Political life
Krishna Pillai who began his political life as a Gandhian and a member of the Indian National Congress in his early youth had gradually transformed into a socialist with communist leanings. And when in 1934 Congress Socialist workers formed the Congress Socialist Party in Bombay, Krishna Pillai was appointed its secretary in Kerala, all the while functioning under the banner of the Indian National Congress.

By 1936, Krishna Pillai who until then had concentrated his political activities to the Malabar region now campaigned in the Cochin and Travancore. In 1938, he organized the famous worker's strike in Alappuzha (Alleppey), which turned out to be a great success and one of the inspiring factors behind the Punnapra-Vayalar Struggle of 1946 and the eventual downfall of the rule of C. P. Ramaswami Iyer in Travancore.

The successful transformation of the Malabar unit of the Congress Socialist Party into the Kerala unit of the Communist Party of India (CPI) was mainly due to the untiring work of Krishna Pillai. The formal formation of the CPI unit in Kerala was on 26 January 1940. Years later in 1948 when the CPI accepted the Calcutta Thesis which included in it the express need for an armed struggle against the Indian state, CPI faced a nationwide ban and most of its leaders including Krishna Pillai were forced into hiding.

Death
While hiding in a worker's hut in Muhamma, Krishna Pillai sustained a snakebite and succumbed to it, aged just 42.

In popular culture 
Samuthirakani portrays Pillai in the 2014 film Vasanthathinte Kanal Vazhikalil.

In the grand strategy video game Hearts of Iron IV, Krishna Pillai becomes the leader of India, should it turn communist.

References

External links

Prakash Karat: Kerala's 'First Communist'
R. Krishnakumar: A man and a movement

1906 births
Indian independence activists from Kerala
Indian National Congress politicians from Kerala
Trade unionists from Kerala
Communist Party of India politicians from Kerala
Malayali politicians
1948 deaths
Indian atheists
People from Vaikom
20th-century Indian politicians
Prisoners and detainees of British India